The 2003 Coupe Internationale de Nice was the 9th edition of an annual international figure skating competition held in Nice, France. It was held between November 6th and 9th, 2003. Skaters competed in the disciplines of men's singles, ladies' singles, and pair skating on the levels of senior, junior, and novice.

Senior results

Men

Ladies

Pairs

Junior results

Men

Ladies

Pairs

External links
 9th Coupe Internationale de la Ville de Nice results

Coupe Internationale de Nice
Coupe Internationale De Nice, 2003